Lake Golovița is part of a complex of lagoons on Romania's Black Sea coast. This closure was completed artificially in the 1970s, and has caused the lagoon to lose all salinity, increase renewal times to over a year, and develop eutrophication. It is part of the Danube Delta Biosphere Reserve.

Because of their wide connection, Golovița is often subsumed under Lake Razelm in official documents. The Lake Razelm/Golovița complex is the largest lake in Romania.

References 

Golovita
Golovita
Geography of Tulcea County
Golovita
Golovita